RAF Kidbrooke was a Royal Air Force base, situated in Kidbrooke in south-east London, in the Royal Borough of Greenwich. The site was operational from 1917 to 1965 and was mainly used as a stores, maintenance and training facility.

History
Established in 1917, the facility was initially a Royal Flying Corps storage depot, situated on both sides of the railway line close to Kidbrooke railway station. In 1917, several large storage warehouses and offices were constructed, that stretched for  alongside both sides of the line, served by sidings and an extensive  gauge network. In December of 1917, RFC Kidbrooke was placed under the command of Lt. Col. William Henry Lang.

The RFC became the RAF on 1 April 1918. Kidbrooke was named No 1 Stores Depot in March 1920. It became No 1 Equipment Depot in February 1937 and No 1 Maintenance Unit in April 1938. It was disbanded as a stores in February 1947, though its facilities remained in use but managed from elsewhere.

During the Second World War, the base was expanded to include a barrage balloon depot, providing balloons to defend London against low-flying enemy aircraft. This was also the base for the No 1 Balloon Centre and 901 Squadron (a barrage balloon squadron of the Auxiliary Air Force) and No 2 Installation Unit, responsible for constructing and repairing Chain Home radar station masts. On adjacent land to the north of the railway line, No. 141 Gliding School RAF for the Air Training Corps operated from October 1942 to December 1945, after which it transferred to RAF Gravesend and then RAF Detling in north Kent. After the war, the radar installation Unit transferred to RAF West Drayton in Middlesex.

Between 1949 and 1953, the Joint Services School for Linguists taught servicemen and women with an aptitude for languages to speak Russian. In January 1954, the RAF Movements School was formed at RAF Kidbrooke, tasked to provide cargo movements and mobility training to personnel of all three Services and other Government departments. It had a staff of 47 and ran around 25 courses, ranging in length from under a week to a 17-week basic recruit course, delivered to over 1,900 personnel per annum. In January 1963, the School moved to  RAF Kirton in Lindsey, Lincolnshire, but was disbanded the following December.

RAF Kidbrooke was also the home of No 4 MT Squadron.  The squadron, manned by service and civilian personnel and equipped with a variety of vehicles including heavy trucks and Queen Mary low loaders, was responsible for the movement of equipment mainly in the south of England.  It also provided vehicles such as the Scammel Scarab in the London Docks. All RAF personnel were posted away in 1967 when the squadron civilianised.  When RAF Kidbrooke closed in around 1968/69, the civilian staff and vehicles were relocated to Woolwich Arsenal.

Wartime murder
During the Second World War, on 14 February 1944, Iris Miriam Deeley, a leading aircraftwoman with No 1 Balloon Centre was murdered near Well Hall railway station as she was returning to Kidbrooke. Her murderer, Ernest Kemp, was arrested a week later. He was tried and convicted at the Old Bailey, and, after being condemned to death, was executed at Wandsworth Prison on 6 June 1944.

The site today
After the base's closure, much of the site was used for housing, with the Ferrier Estate (1968–2012) being constructed to the south of the railway lines. In the 1980s the Rochester Way Relief Road was built across the northern part of the site, alongside the railway line, carrying the A2 south of its earlier route. The Kidbrooke training facility was on the site today occupied by Thomas Tallis School, in which the RAF Linguists' Association unveiled a commemorative plaque in 2008 (re-dedicated in July 2014).

Part of the eastern side of the open land of the glider school site, which was north and east of the base itself, is now occupied by The Halley Academy (from 1954 to 2011, Kidbrooke School).

Notes

References

Royal Air Force stations in London
Military installations established in 1917
Military installations closed in 1965
Buildings and structures in the Royal Borough of Greenwich
Military history of London
Defence of London